Ryan David Brasier (born August 26, 1987) is an American professional baseball pitcher for the Boston Red Sox of Major League Baseball (MLB). Brasier previously played for the Los Angeles Angels of MLB, and for the Hiroshima Toyo Carp of Nippon Professional Baseball (NPB).

Career
Brasier attended Rider High School in Wichita Falls, Texas, and Weatherford College in Weatherford, Texas.

Los Angeles Angels
The Angels selected him in the sixth round of the 2007 Major League Baseball draft. From 2007 through 2013, Brasier pitched for various Angels farm teams, starting with the Rookie League Orem Owlz and reaching the Triple-A Salt Lake Bees. He made a career-high 55 appearances (all in relief) with the Bees in 2012, recording 13 saves along with a 7–3 record, 54 strikeouts, and 24 walks in  innings pitched.

The Angels promoted Brasier to the major leagues for the first time on May 1, 2013. He made his MLB debut the next day, pitching an inning of relief against the Baltimore Orioles, allowing two runs on two hits. After making one additional appearance in May, he returned to the minors and was recalled in September when the major league rosters expanded; he made five appearances during the month. Overall, with the 2013 Angels, Brasier made seven appearances, striking out seven and walking four in nine innings pitched with a 2.00 ERA. Brasier was outrighted off of the Angels 40-man roster on October 28, 2014.

Oakland Athletics
On July 7, 2015, Brasier signed a minor league deal with the Oakland Athletics. He spent 2015 and 2016 in Oakland's farm system, including 46 relief appearances with the Triple-A Nashville Sounds in 2016, recording a 3.56 ERA in  innings.

Hiroshima Toyo Carp
The Athletics sold his contract to the Hiroshima Toyo Carp of Nippon Professional Baseball on December 14, 2016. With the Carp in 2017, Brasier made 26 relief appearances; in 30 innings of work he struck out 19, walked eight, and had a 3.00 ERA.

Boston Red Sox
On March 4, 2018, Brasier signed a minor-league contract with the Boston Red Sox. Pitching for the Pawtucket Red Sox of the Triple-A International League, he was selected to appear in the Triple-A All-Star Game. The Red Sox promoted Brasier to the major leagues on July 8; he made his Boston debut the next day, pitching one inning against the Texas Rangers and retiring the side in order. On August 30, Brasier recorded his first MLB win, pitching an inning of scoreless relief in a come-from-behind victory over the Chicago White Sox. Brasier proved to be a consistent reliever down the stretch, finishing with a 1.60 ERA in 34 appearances, and was the recipient of the Red Sox' Lou Gorman Award. Brasier was included on Boston's postseason roster, making a total of nine appearances and allowing one earned run in  innings, as Boston went on to win the World Series.

Brasier was included on Boston's Opening Day roster to start the 2019 season. On April 3, Brasier recorded his first major league save in closing out a 6–3 win over the Athletics. He was placed on the bereavement/family medical emergency list on June 11, and re-activated on June 17. Brasier was optioned to Pawtucket on July 16, and recalled to Boston on August 17. Overall with the 2019 Red Sox, Brasier appeared in 62 games, compiling a 2–4 record with seven saves, along with a 4.85 ERA and 61 strikeouts in  innings.

With the 2020 Red Sox, Brasier appeared in 25 games (one start), compiling a 1–0 record with 3.96 ERA and 30 strikeouts in 25 innings pitched. In early December 2020, Brasier and the Red Sox reached a one-year deal for the 2021 season. Before appearing in a 2021 game, Brasier was placed on the 60-day injured list with a calf injury on May 3. On June 3, he was hospitalized after being hit in the head by a line drive during a simulated game at Boston's training complex in Fort Myers, Florida. Brasier returned to the Red Sox on September 1, was optioned to the Triple-A Worcester Red Sox on September 17, and recalled on September 21. Overall during the 2021 regular season, Brasier made 13 appearances with Boston, all in relief, compiling a 1.50 ERA and 1–1 record while striking out nine batters in 12 innings. He also made seven relief appearances in the postseason, as the Red Sox advanced to the American League Championship Series. On November 30, the Red Sox agreed to terms with Brasier on a one-year contract for 2022, reportedly worth $1.4 million.

Brasier began the 2022 season as a member of Boston's bullpen. On May 20, with a 6.28 ERA in 18 appearances, he was optioned to Triple-A Worcester. He was recalled to Boston on May 28. In 68 relief appearances with the Red Sox, Brasier posted an 0–3 record with a 5.78 ERA and one save while striking out 64 batters in  innings.

On January 13, 2023, the Red Sox and Brasier reached agreement on a one-year contract, avoiding salary arbitration.

References

External links

1987 births
Living people
American expatriate baseball players in Japan
Arizona League Angels players
Arizona League Athletics players
Arkansas Travelers players
Baseball players from Texas
Boston Red Sox players
Cedar Rapids Kernels players
Hiroshima Toyo Carp players
Los Angeles Angels players
Major League Baseball pitchers
Nashville Sounds players
Nippon Professional Baseball pitchers
Orem Owlz players
Pawtucket Red Sox players
People from Wichita Falls, Texas
Rancho Cucamonga Quakes players
Salt Lake Bees players
Weatherford Coyotes baseball players
Worcester Red Sox players
Portland Sea Dogs players